Estonian Tennis Championships are the national championships in tennis, organised every year by the Estonian Tennis Association from 1920.

Winners

References

External links
 All winners from 1920

Tennis
Tennis tournaments in Estonia
Recurring sporting events established in 1920
National tennis championships
1920 establishments in Estonia